Battle of Jeddah may refer to:
Siege of Jeddah (1517) - Naval battle Between Ottoman Empire and Portuguese Empire
Siege of Jeddah (1520) - Naval battle Between Ottoman Empire and Portuguese Empire
Battle of Jeddah (1813) - Between Ottoman Empire and First Saudi State
Battle of Jeddah (1925) - Between Kingdom of Hejaz and Sultanate of Nejd (Saudi Arabia)